Antonio Velasco Piña (8 September 1935 – 27 December 2020) was a Mexican novelist, spiritual writer and essayist.

He was the founder of La Nueva Mexicanidad, a group advocating the Mexicanism or Mexicanista (Mexicayotl) movement purportedly based on Aztec religion and Aztec Superiority over all other indigenous tribes.
The movement is partly inspired by the writings of French anthropologist  Laurette Séjourné who specialized on  Aztec and Mesoamerican spirituality.

El círculo negro (2006) presents a conspiracy theory according to which Mexico during the mid 20th century was governed by a secret society called "the black circle" or the descendants of The Aztec Triple Alliance Elite  which assassinated Mexican presidents who sought reelection. Rewriting history and propagandizing Aztec Culture over all Mexicanos and American Chicanos.

Piña died from COVID-19 in 2020.

Bibliography
 Anibal y Escipion (2013) 
 El retorno de las Águilas y los Jaguares (2012) 
 El círculo negro (2012) 
 Los Siete rayos (2010) 
 Dos Guerreros Olmecas (2010) 
 Cartas a Elisabeth (2009) 
 El Retorno de lo sagrado (2009) 
 San Judas Tadeo 
 Regina - Dos de octubre no se olvida (1987)
 El despertar de Teotihuacan (1994)
 Tlacaelel, El Azteca entre los Aztecas
 La mujer dormida debe dar a luz

References

Jelena Galovic, Los grupos místico-espirituales de la actualidad, Plaza y Valdes, 2002, 137-158.

External links
https://web.archive.org/web/20100830071846/http://antoniovelascopina.mx/

Mexican male writers
1935 births
New Age writers
Mexican conspiracy theorists
2020 deaths
Mexican modern pagans
Modern pagan writers
Modern pagan novelists
Deaths from the COVID-19 pandemic in Mexico